Mary Ann Beavis (born July 26, 1955) is a Professor Emerita, St. Thomas More College, the University of Saskatchewan. She co-founded the peer-reviewed academic journal, S/HE: An International Journal of Goddess Studies, together with Helen Hye-Sook Hwang in 2021.

Books
The First Christian Slave: Onesimus in Context. Eugene, OR: Cascade, 2021.

What Does the Bible Say? A Critical Conversation with Popular Culture in a Biblically Illiterate World. Eugene, OR: Cascade, 2017. Co-authored with HyeRan Kim-Cragg.

1-2 Thessalonians. Wisdom Commentaries. Co-authored with Florence Gillman and HyeRan Kim-Cragg. Collegeville, MN: Liturgical Press, 2016.

The Epistle to the Hebrews: Wisdom Commentaries. Collegeville, MN: Liturgical Press, 2015. Co-authored with HyeRan Kim-Cragg.

Christian Goddess Spirituality: Enchanting Christianity. New York: Routledge, 2015.

The Gospel of Mark. Paideia Commentaries on the New Testament. Grand Rapids, MI: Baker Academic, 2011.

Jesus and Utopia: Looking for the Kingdom of God in the Roman Empire.  Minneapolis:  Fortress Press, 2006.

Mark’s Audience:  Literary and Social Aspects of Mark 4:11-12.  JSNTSS 33; Sheffield:  Academic, 1989.

Edited Works

Co-editor with Ally Kateusz. Rediscovering the Marys: Maria, Mariamne, Miriam. London: T. & T. Clark, 2020.

Co-editor with Helen Hye-Sook Hwang. Goddesses in Myth, History and Culture. Lytle Creek, CA: Mago Books, 2018. .

Co-editor with Helen Hye-Sook Hwang. Celebrating Seasons of the Goddesses. Mago Books, 2017. .

Co-editor with Michael Gilmour. Dictionary of the Bible and Western Culture. Sheffield: Phoenix Press, 2012.

Editor. Feminist Theology with a Canadian Accent: Canadian Contextual Feminist Theology. Ottawa: Novalis, 2008.

Coeditor with Moira Day. Theatre Research in Canada 27,3 (2006). Special Issue on Religion and Theatre in Canada.

Editor.  The Lost Coin: Parables of Women, Work and Wisdom.  The Biblical Seminar 86; Sheffield: Academic/Continuum, 2002.

Referred Articles
“Goddesses in Every Girl? Goddess Feminism and Children’s Literature.” S/he: An International Journal of Goddess Studies 1,1 (2022) 115-38.

“Six Years a Slave: The Confessio of St. Patrick as Slave Narrative.” Irish Theological Quarterly 2020, 85,4 (2020) 339–51.

“Slaves Obey Your Masters according to the Flesh (Col 3:22a; Eph 6:5a) in Servile Perspective.” Listening: Journal of Communication Ethics, Religion, and Culture 56 (2021) 251-61.

“The Parable of the Talents (Matthew 25:14-30): Imagining A Slave’s Perspective.” Journal of the Gospels and Acts Research 2 (October 2018) 7-21.

“The Parable of the Slave, Son and Vineyard: A Freedman’s Narrative. Catholic Biblical Quarterly 80,3 (October 2018) 655-69.

“From Holy Grail to Lost Gospel: Margaret Starbird and Mary Magdalene Scholarship.” Journal of Religion and Popular Culture 27,3 (2015) 236-49.

“Christian Goddess Spirituality and Thealogy.” Feminist Theology 24,2 (2016) 125-38.

“Mary of Bethany and a Hermeneutic of Remembrance.” Catholic Biblical Quarterly 22 (2013) 739-55.

“The Deification of Mary Magdalene.” Feminist Theology 21,2 (2012) 145-54.

“The Cathar Mary Magdalene and the Sacred Feminine: Pop Culture Legend vs. Medieval Doctrine.” Journal of Religion and Popular Culture 24:3 (2012) 419-31.

“Reconsidering Mary of Bethany.” Catholic Biblical Quarterly  74,2 (2012) 281-97.

“Five Filmic Utopias at the Turn of the Millennium.” Journal of Contemporary Thought: Special Issue on Utopias Today! (July 2010).

“The Resurrection of Jephthah’s Daughter: Judges 11:34-40 and Mark 5:21-24, 35-43.” Catholic Biblical Quarterly 72 (2010) 46-62.

“Christian Origins, Egalitarianism and Utopianism.” Journal for the Feminist Study of Religion 23.2 (2007) 27-50.

“Still Crazy:  An Unsung Homage to the New Testament.”  Journal of Religion and Film 8,2 (October 2004) http://avalon.unomaha.edu/jrf/Vol8No2/crazy.htm.

“Philo’s Therapeutai:  Philosopher’s Dream or Utopian Construct?”  Journal for the Study of the Pseudepigrapha.  14,1 (2004) 30-42.

“A Daughter in Israel:  Celebrating Bat Jephtha (Judges 11:39d-40).”  Feminist Theology  13 (2004) 11-25.

“The Kingdom of God, ‘Utopia’ and Theocracy.”  Journal for the Study of the Historical Jesus 2.1 (2004) 91-106.

“‘Angels Carrying Savage Weapons’:  Uses of the Bible in Horror Films.”  Journal of Religion and Film 7.2 (2003) https://digitalcommons.unomaha.edu/jrf/vol7/iss2/2/.

“‘I like the bird’: Avian Metaphors and Feminist Theology.”  Feminist Theology 12 (2003) 118-27.

“‘Prey for Us’:  Biblical/Theological Themes in a ‘Cult’ TV Sci-Fi Drama.”  Journal of Religion and Popular Culture 1 (2002).  http://www.usask.ca/relst/jrpc/articles.html

“The Power of Jesus’ Parables: Were They Polemical or Irenic?” Journal for the Study of the New Testament 82 (2001): 3-30.

“‘Pluck the rose but shun the thorns’: The Ancient School and Christian Origins.”  Studies in Religion/Sciences religieuses 29,4 (2000): 411-23.

“The Sweet Hereafter: Law, Wisdom and Family Revisited.”  Journal of Religion and Film 4,3 (2000). http://www.unomaha.edu/~wwwjrf/sweether.htm

“Fargo: A Biblical Morality Play.”  Journal of Religion and Film 4,2 (2000). http://www.unomaha.edu/~wwwjrf/vol4no2.htm

“From the Margin to the Way: A Feminist Reading of the Story of Bartimaeus.”  Journal of Feminist Studies in Religion 14, 1 (1998) 19-39.

“‘Expecting Nothing in Return’:  Luke’s Picture of the Marginalized.”  Interpretation 48 (1994) 357-68.

“Ancient Slavery as an Interpretive Context for the Servant Parables, with Special Reference to the Unjust Steward.”  Journal of Biblical Literature 111 (1992) 37-54.

“Parable and Fable.”  Catholic Biblical Quarterly 52 (1990) 473-98. 

“Women as Models of Faith in Mark.”  Biblical Theology Bulletin 18 (1988) 3-9.

“Anti-Egyptian Polemic in the Letter of Aristeas 130-165 (The High Priest’s Discourse).”  Journal for the Study of Judaism 28 (1988) 145-51. 

“The Trial before the Sanhedrin (Mark 14:53-65, Reader Response, and Greco-Roman Readers).”  Catholic Biblical Quarterly 49 (1987) 581-96. 

“Mark’s Teaching on Faith.”  Biblical Theology Bulletin 16 (1986) 139-42.

Other Articles

Coauthored with Chris Klassen and Scott Dunbar. “The Journal of Religion and Popular Culture: More than Old Wine in New Bottles.” Religion 43,3 (2013) 421-33.

“Who is Mary Magdalene?” Christian Reflection: A Series in Faith and Ethics. Women in the Bible (ed. Robert B. Kruschwitz; Waco: Baylor University Press, 2013) 23-29.

“Listening to Mark: A Response to McVann, Cardwell, Chapman, Sánchez—And a Suggestion.” Listening: Journal of Communication Ethics, Religion, and Culture 47,3 (2012) 264-75.

“‘Like Rachel and Leah:’ The Mothers of Genesis,” The Bible Today 50,3 (May/June 2012) 151-58.

“‘Like yeast a woman took’: Feminist Interpretations of the Parables,” Review and Expositor 109,2 (Spring 2012) 219-31.

“I Commend to You Our Sister: Women in Romans 16.” The Bible Today 45 (July 2008). 227-32. Invited by editor.

“The Dangerous Gospel:  Women in the Gospel of Luke.” The Bible Today 44 (January/February 2007) 28-32. Invited by editor.

“The Theme of Child Sacrifice in the Work of Canadian Women Authors,” SBL Forum 4,1 (January 2006). http://www.sbl-site.org/publications/article.aspx?articleId=476 .

“‘She had heard about Jesus’:  Women Listening to the Gospel of Mark.”  The Bible Today 43 (January/February 2006) 25-29. Invited by editor.

“The New Covenant and Judaism.”  The Bible Today 22 (1984) 24-30.

Book Chapters

“Which Mary, and Why It Matters.” Rediscovering the Marys, 25-38.

“From Holy Grail to The Lost Gospel: Margaret Starbird and the Mary Magdalene Romance.” Rediscovering the Marys, 227-34.

“From Skepticism to Piety: The Bible in Horror Films.” The Bible in Motion: A Handbook of the Bible and its Reception in Film (ed. Rhonda Burnette-Bletsch; Berlin: De Gruyter, 2016), 223-36.

“Freedom and Slavery.” Oxford Encyclopedia of the Bible (ed. Samuel E. Balentine; Oxford: Oxford University Press, 2014). Oxford Reference, 6 pp.

“‘You Give them Something to Eat’ (Mark 6:37): Beyond a Hermeneutic of Hunger.” In Sheila E. McGinn, Lai Ling Ngan and Ahida Pilarski, eds. By Bread Alone: The Bible through the Eyes of the Hungry (Minneapolis: Fortress, 2014), 95-112.

“2 Thessalonians.” Women’s Bible Commentary, Newly Revised and Updated (ed. Carol A. Newsom Sharon H. Ringe and Jacqueline E. Lapsley; Louisville, LY: Westminster John Knox Press, 2012) 592-94.

“Jesus of Montreal.” The Bible and Cinema: Fifty Key Films (ed. Adele Reinhartz; London/New York: Routledge, 2012) 145-49.

“Jesus in Utopian Context.” Tom Holmén (ed.), Jesus in Continuum (Wissenschaftliche Untersuchungen zum Neuen Testament Reihe A; Tübingen: Mohr, 2011) 133-52.

“Pseudapocrypha: Invented Scripture in Apocalyptic Horror Films.” In John Walliss and Lee Quinby, eds. Reel Revelations: Apocalypse and Film, 75-90. Sheffield: Sheffield Phoenix, 2010.

“Jesus of Canada? Four Canadian Constructions of the Christ Figure.” In Ellen Leonard and Kate Merriman, eds. From Logos to Chrisos: Essays on Christology in Honour of Joanne McWilliam, 19-37. Editions SR 34; Waterloo, ON: Wilfrid Laurier University Press.

“Feminist (and other) Reflections on the Woman with Seven Husbands (Mark 12:20-23.” In Ruben Zimmermann, ed. Hermeneutik der Gleichnisse Jesus: Methodische Neuansätze zum Verstehen urchristlicher Parabeltexte, 603-17.Wissenschaftliche Untersuchungen zum Neuen Testament 213; Tübingen: Mohr Siebeck, 2008.

“Introduction.” Mary Ann Beavis, ed. Feminist Theology with a Canadian Accent: Canadian Contextual Feminist Theology, 1-22. Ottawa: Novalis, Spring 2008.

“The Influence of Feminist Theology of Canadian Women Artists.” In Mary Ann Beavis, ed. Feminist Theology with A Canadian Accent: Canadian Contextual Feminist Theology, 291-308. Ottawa: Novalis, 2008.

“The Aqedah, Jephtha’s Daughter, and the Theme of Child Sacrifice in the Work of Canadian Women Authors.” In Mary Ann Beavis, ed. Feminist Theology with A Canadian Accent: Canadian Contextual Feminist Theology, 353-70. Ottawa: Novalis, Spring 2008.

“Christianity without Christ:  Historical Jesus Scholarship and Feminist Theology/Thealogy.”   In Amy-Jill Levine, ed., Feminist Companion to the New Testament:  The Historical Jesus (London/New York:  Continuum, forthcoming).  Invited by editor.

“Introduction: Seeking the ‘Lost Coin’ of Parables about Women.”  In Mary Ann Beavis, ed., The Lost Coin: Parables of Women, Work and Wisdom.”  London/New York:  Sheffield/Continuum, 2002, 17-33.

“Joy in Heaven, Sorrow on Earth: Luke 15.10.”  In Mary Ann Beavis, ed., The Lost Coin: Parables of Women, Work and Wisdom.”  London/New York:  Sheffield/Continuum, 2002, 39-45.

“‘Making Up Stories: A Feminist Reading of the Parable of the Prodigal Son (Lk. 15.11b-32).”  In Mary Ann Beavis, ed., The Lost Coin: Parables of Women, Work and Wisdom.”  London/New York:  Sheffield/Continuum, 2002, 98-123.

“Jezebel Speaks: Naming the Goddess in the Book of Revelation.”  In Amy-Jill Levine, ed., Feminist Companion to the Apocalypse of John.  Sheffield: Sheffield Phoenix.

“‘If any one will not work, let them not eat’:  2 Thessalonians 3.10 and the Social Support of Women.”  In Amy-Jill Levine, ed., A Feminist Companion to the Deutero-Pauline Epistles, 29-36.  London/New York:  T. & T. Clark, 2003.

“‘Expecting Nothing in Return’: Luke’s Picture of the Marginalized.”  In Jack Dean Kingsbury, ed., Gospel Interpretation: Narrative-Critical and Social-Scientific Approaches, 142-54. Harrisburg, PA: Trinity Press International, 1997.  Reprint of Interpretation article (see above).

“The Parable of the Foolish Landowner.”  In G. Shillington, ed., Jesus and His Parables (Edinburgh: T. & T. Clark, 1997), 55-68.

“2 Thessalonians.”  In Elisabeth Schüssler Fiorenza, ed., Searching the Scriptures:  A Feminist Commentary (New York:  Crossroad, 1994) 601-10.

See also
Pheme Perkins
Parable of the Lost Coin
Journal of Religion and Popular Culture

References

External links
Mary Ann Beavis at St. Thomas More College

Living people
Religious studies scholars
1955 births
Alumni of the University of Cambridge
University of Notre Dame alumni
University of Manitoba alumni
Academic staff of the University of Saskatchewan